New Albin is a city in Iowa Township, Allamakee County, Iowa, United States. It is the northeasternmost town in Iowa, located on the Mississippi River and the Minnesota border. The population was 432 at the time of the 2020 census.

History
New Albin was platted in 1872 shortly after the Chicago, Dubuque and Minnesota Railroad had been built through that territory. It was named for the son of a railroad official.

Geography
New Albin is located at  (43.497019, -91.287328).

Demographics

2010 census
As of the census of 2010, there were 522 people, 222 households, and 138 families living in the city. The racial makeup of the city was 97.1% White, 0.4% African American, 1.5% Native American, 0.4% Asian, 0.2% from other races, and 0.4% from two or more races. Hispanic or Latino of any race were 0.4% of the population.

There were 222 households, of which 27.9% had children under the age of 18 living with them, 50.5% were married couples living together, 7.7% had a female householder with no husband present, 4.1% had a male householder with no wife present, and 37.8% were non-families. 32.9% of all households were made up of individuals, and 17.6% had someone living alone who was 65 years of age or older. The average household size was 2.35 and the average family size was 3.01.

The median age in the city was 43.5 years. 25.3% of residents were under the age of 18; 5.6% were between the ages of 18 and 24; 21.1% were from 25 to 44; 25.7% were from 45 to 64; and 22.2% were 65 years of age or older. The gender makeup of the city was 49.6% male and 50.4% female.

2000 census
As of the census of 2000, there were 527 people, 226 households, and 139 families living in the city. The racial makeup of the city was 97.15% White, 1.14% Native American, 0.19% from other races, and 1.52% from two or more races. Hispanic or Latino of any race were 0.57% of the population.

There were 226 households, out of which 29.2% had children under the age of 18 living with them, 50.0% were married couples living together, 8.0% had a female householder with no husband present, and 38.1% were non-families. 34.1% of all households were made up of individuals, and 15.9% had someone living alone who was 65 years of age or older. The average household size was 2.33 and the average family size was 2.99.

Age spread: 26.9% under the age of 18, 7.6% from 18 to 24, 25.8% from 25 to 44, 19.4% from 45 to 64, and 20.3% who were 65 years of age or older. The median age was 38 years. For every 100 females, there were 95.2 males. For every 100 females age 18 and over, there were 96.4 males.

The median income for a household in the city was $32,981, and the median income for a family was $36,667. Males had a median income of $26,625 versus $19,375 for females. The per capita income for the city was $14,049. About 4.5% of families and 6.6% of the population were below the poverty line, including 6.3% of those under age 18 and 8.5% of those age 65 or over.

Notable person
Milt Gantenbein, NFL player for the Green Bay Packers and three-time NFL champion, was born in New Albin

References

Cities in Allamakee County, Iowa
Cities in Iowa
Iowa populated places on the Mississippi River
1872 establishments in Iowa
Populated places established in 1872